Lukáčovce is a village and municipality in the Nitra District in western central Slovakia, in the Nitra Region.

History
In historical records the village was first mentioned in 1309.

Geography
The village lies at an altitude of 183 metres and covers an area of 16.837 km². It has a population of about 1126 people.

Ethnicity
The village is approximately 99% Slovak.

Facilities
The village has a public library, a gym and football pitch.

References

External links
 
 

Villages and municipalities in Nitra District